is a Japanese novelist best known for the creation of the Shakugan no Shana series. Shakugan no Shana was adapted into a radio drama, manga, anime, and a video game. In addition, it was adapted into an anime film on April 21, 2007. Takahashi also made another series titled A/B Extreme, which won Honorable mention in the eighth Dengeki Novel Prize. Most of his work includes references to the tokusatsu .

Works 
A/B Extreme (2002–2004)
A/B Extreme - CASE-314 Emperor
A/B Extreme - Mask of Nicolaus 
A/B Extreme - Dream of Abraxas
Shakugan no Shana (2002–2012)
22 main novels and 4 short story collections
Kanae no Hoshi (2014-?)

Others
Bludgeoning Angel Dokuro-Chan desu (collective writing)
Atelier Ryza: Ever Darkness & the Secret Hideout (scenario writer)
Atelier Ryza: Ever Darkness & the Secret Hideout (anime scriptwriter)

References

External links 

Light novelists
Living people
Year of birth missing (living people)